Safe at Home is an American sitcom created for and aired on TBS, then known as "Superstation WTBS". The series premiered on March 18, 1985, and was produced by The Arthur Company, which also produced TBS' two other original comedies of the time, Down to Earth and Rocky Road.

Plot

Initially, the show focused on Caroline Ford, a young woman who moves away from her mom and dad to join her older brother in Chicago. Martha Nix originally played Caroline for season 1 and was replaced by Katherine Britton. Her brother Dan Ford, played by Michael J Cutt, worked as a sports anchor for a news broadcast along with his on-air sidekick, Tatum McCoy (played by Jeanna Michaels). In later episodes, they developed a relationship and eventually married. In fact, the series began focusing more on their relationship.

Michael J. Cutt originally did not get top billing in the series credits; however, when they replaced the character of Caroline, he became the star of the show. Other cast changes were made throughout the series run. Besides changing the lead actress in the series after the first season, Gary Hudson originally played Dan's friend Roger. He left the series shortly after and was replaced by Vic Dunlop, who played Dokey in season 2. Vic Dunlop left the following season and although both the characters of Dokey and Roger were mentioned from time to time, they were never seen again.

Richard Steven Horvitz played Gary, who was the nephew of the station's owner where the newscast took place. He worked for the newscast. He left midway through the final season. James Coburn was added to the cast during the final season as Caroline's love interest.

One other notable cast member was Brenda Lynn Klemme, who played Amy, the ditzy best friend of Caroline.

See also
 Down to Earth
 The New Leave It to Beaver
 Rocky Road

References

External links
 

1985 American television series debuts
1987 American television series endings
1980s American sitcoms
TBS (American TV channel) original programming
Television shows set in Chicago
English-language television shows